Germany participated in the Eurovision Song Contest 2009 with the song "Miss Kiss Kiss Bang" written by Alex Christensen and Steffen Häfelinger. The song was performed by Alex Swings Oscar Sings!. The German entry for the 2009 contest in Moscow, Russia was internally selected by the German broadcaster ARD in collaboration with Norddeutscher Rundfunk (NDR). The announcement of "Miss Kiss Kiss Bang" as the German entry occurred on 9 February 2009 and the presentation of the song occurred during the Echo Awards on 21 February 2009.

As a member of the "Big Four", Germany automatically qualified to compete in the final of the Eurovision Song Contest. Performing in position 17, Germany placed twentieth out of the 25 participating countries with 35 points.

Background 

Germany has won the contest on one occasion: in 1982 with the song "Ein bißchen Frieden" performed by Nicole. Germany, to this point, has been noted for having competed in the contest more than any other country; they have competed in every contest since the first edition in 1956 except for the 1996 contest when the nation was eliminated in a pre-contest elimination round. In 2008, the German entry "Disappear" performed by No Angels placed twenty-third out of twenty-five competing songs scoring 14 points.

The German national broadcaster, ARD, broadcasts the event within Germany and delegates the selection of the nation's entry to the regional broadcaster Norddeutscher Rundfunk (NDR). NDR confirmed that Germany would participate in the 2009 Eurovision Song Contest on 9 June 2008. Since 1996, NDR had set up national finals with several artists to choose both the song and performer to compete at Eurovision for Germany. Following the resignation of Thomas Hermanns as the national final host, there were rumours that the 2009 national final would feature changes. Instead, ARD's entertainment coordinator Thomas Schreiber announced on 16 December 2008 that they would be "taking a break from the usual procedure" and organise an internal selection to select the German entry.

Before Eurovision

Internal selection 
NDR announced on 16 December 2008 that the German entry for the Eurovision Song Contest 2009 would be selected internally. German artists and composers with GEMA membership and having achieved previous chart success were called upon to submit their entries until 22 January 2009. Ralph Siegel, who had previously composed 19 Eurovision entries for various countries, expressed his interest in submitting an entry. Approximately 100 proposals were received by NDR at the closing of the deadline and the German entry was selected by a five-member panel consisting of Heinz Canibol (105music managing partner), Guildo Horn (singer, 1998 German Eurovision entrant), Sylvia Kollek (music consultant), Ralf Quibeldey (head of the fiction and entertainment department for NDR, head of German delegation for Eurovision) and Peter Urban (musician and radio host, German commentator for the Eurovision Song Contest).

On 9 February 2009. "Miss Kiss Kiss Bang" performed by Alex Swings Oscar Sings! was announced by NDR as the German entry for the 2009 Eurovision Song Contest. Alex Swings Oscar Sings! and the song, written by Alex Christensen together with Steffen Häfelinger, was one of twelve proposals shortlisted by the five-member panel. The presentation of the song occurred during the Echo Awards on 21 February 2009, hosted by Barbara Schöneberger and Oliver Pocher and broadcast on Das Erste.

At Eurovision

According to Eurovision rules, all nations with the exceptions of the host country and the "Big Four" (France, Germany, Spain and the United Kingdom) are required to qualify from the semi-final in order to compete for the final; the top ten countries from the semi-final progress to the final. As a member of the "Big 4", Germany automatically qualified to compete in the final on 16 May 2009. In addition to their participation in the final, Germany is also required to broadcast and vote in one of the two semi-finals. During the semi-final allocation draw on 30 January 2009, Germany was assigned to broadcast and vote in the first semi-final on 12 May 2009. On 16 March 2009, Germany was drawn to perform in position seventeen, following Denmark and preceding Turkey. At the conclusion of the final during which American burlesque model Dita von Teese joined Alex and Oscar on stage, Germany placed twentieth in the final, scoring 35 points.

In Germany, the two shows were broadcast on Das Erste which featured commentary by Tim Frühling who replaced Peter Urban due to illness, and the final was broadcast on NDR 2 which featured commentary by Ina Müller and Thomas Mohr. The German spokesperson, who announced the top 12-point score awarded by the German vote during the final, was Thomas Anders.

Voting 
Below is a breakdown of points awarded to Germany and awarded by Germany in the first semi-final and grand final of the contest, and the breakdown of the voting conducted during the two shows. Germany awarded its 12 points to Turkey in the first semi-final and to Norway in the grand final of the contest.

Points awarded to Germany

Points awarded by Germany

Detailed voting results

References 

2009
Countries in the Eurovision Song Contest 2009
Eurovision
Eurovision